The 1999 Vladikavkaz bombing took place in a crowded market in Vladikavkaz, North Ossetia–Alania, Russia on March 19, 1999, killing 52 and injuring 168.

The bombers were tried and convicted on December 15, 2003. The court also convicted the men of the bombing of a military housing unit known as "Sputnik" on May 18, 1999 that left four dead and 17 injured and a Vladikavkaz train station on June 28, 1999, which injured 18 people. In addition, the court found the men guilty in the kidnapping of four Russian officers and taking them to Chechnya for ransom on July 30, 1999. The officers were later released.

Adam Tsurov (b. 1980) was given a life sentence, Abdulrakhim Khutiyev and Makhmud Temirbiyev were sentenced to 23 years of imprisonment, and Umar Khaniyev (b. 1984) received a 10-year sentence.

See also
List of terrorist incidents, 1999
2008 Vladikavkaz bombing
2010 Vladikavkaz bombing

References

20th-century mass murder in Russia
History of North Ossetia–Alania
Marketplace attacks
Mass murder in 1999
Improvised explosive device bombings in Russia
Terrorist incidents in Russia in 1999
March 1999 events in Russia
1999 murders in Russia
Terrorist incidents in Vladikavkaz